Joe O'Connor is an English professional footballer who plays as a defender for  club Tavistock, on loan from  club Exeter City.

Career
O'Connor joined Southern League Division One South side Tavistock on loan on 5 July 2022, along with teammate Aamir Daniels. He made his senior debut for Exeter City on 18 October 2022, after coming on as a 73rd-minute substitute for Gabriel Billington in a 4–1 defeat at Forest Green Rovers in the group stages of the EFL Trophy.

Career statistics

References

Living people
People from Plymouth, Devon
English footballers
Association football defenders
Exeter City F.C. players
Tavistock A.F.C. players
Southern Football League players
Year of birth missing (living people)